Planotortrix is a genus of moths belonging to the subfamily Tortricinae of the family Tortricidae.

Species
Planotortrix avicenniae Dugdale, 1990
Planotortrix excessana (Walker, 1863)
Planotortrix flammea (Salmon, 1956)
Planotortrix notophaea (Turner, 1926)
Planotortrix octo Dugdale, 1990
Planotortrix octoides Dugdale, 1990
Planotortrix puffini Dugdale, 1990

See also
List of Tortricidae genera

References

  1966: A new genus for the New Zealand 'elusive Tortrix' (Lepidoptera: Tortricidae: Tortricinae). New Zealand journal of science, 9: 391–398. BUGZ
  1988: Lepidoptera - annotated catalogue, and keys to family-group taxa. Fauna of New Zealand, (14)
  1990: Reassessment of Ctenopseustis Meyrick and Planotortrix Dugdale with descriptions of two new genera (Lepidoptera: Tortricidae). New Zealand journal of zoology, 17: 437–465.
  et al. 2009: DNA barcoding of the endemic New Zealand leafroller moth genera, Ctenopseustis and Planotortrix. Molecular ecology resources, 9: 691–698.

External links
tortricidae.com

Archipini
Tortricidae genera